The American Dairy Association is a registered name owned by Dairy Management Inc., which also owns the names National Dairy Council and U.S. Dairy Export Council.

The National Dairy Council website offers a collection of educational materials such as dietary guidelines, protein, maintaining a healthy weight, lactose intolerance, and the connection between dairy and sports. They also provide informational kits to health care professionals.

Dairy's role in research 

The National Dairy Association has funded academic research into the impacts of dairy, such as food safety and human health, many of which show the positive impacts of dairy. It also funds new product competitions, such as the 10th Annual National Dairy Council (NDC) New Product Competition which in 2022 holds the theme of "Innovative Dairy-Based Products for Gamers."

References

External links

Agricultural organizations based in the United States